Alexander Nikolaevich Galchenyuk (born July 28, 1967) is a Belarusian former professional ice hockey player who participated in the 1998, 1999, 2000, and 2001 IIHF World Championships as a member of the Belarus men's national ice hockey team.

Galchenyuk was employed as an assistant coach with the Sarnia Sting of the Ontario Hockey League where he coached his son, Alex Galchenyuk, who was selected by the Montreal Canadiens third overall at the 2012 NHL Entry Draft.

Professional career
Galchenyuk began to play top level professional hockey with the HC Dynamo Moscow during the 1985-86 season, staying with this team until the end of the 1991-92 season. He then travelled to the United States where he played the 1992–93 and 1993-94 seasons with the Milwaukee Admirals in the International Hockey League (IHL). Galchenyuk started the 1995-96 season in Germany playing elite level hockey in the Deutsche Eishockey Liga (DEL) with Eisbären Berlin, but returned to the United States before the season's end to join the Madison Monsters of the Colonial Hockey League (CoHL). Midway through the season, he was signed by the Michigan K-Wings of the IHL, where he remained for the following season and a half.

Galchenyuk returned to Europe for the 1998–99 season where he played nine more seasons in various the European leagues including the Russian Superleague where he played with Avangard Omsk and SKA Saint Petersburg. After spending 21 seasons as a professional ice hockey player, Galchenyuk retired following the 2006-07 season.

International play

Soviet Union
At the age of 19, Galchenyuk was selected to represent the Soviet Union at the 1987 World Junior Ice Hockey Championships where he played 13 games and scored 5 points before the Soviet team was disqualified from the tournament following an on-ice brawl with the Canadian Team. He was also selected to play with the senior Soviet Union team that competed for the 1991 Canada Cup.

Belarus
Following the dissolution of the Soviet Union, Galchenyuk went on to represent Belarus in international tournaments. As a member of the Belarus men's national ice hockey team, Galchenyuk competed in four consecutive Ice Hockey World Championships, from 1998–2001, during which he scored a total of 26 points in 24 IIHF World Championship games. He also competed with Team Belarus at the 1998 Winter Olympics.

Career statistics

Regular season and playoffs

International

References

External links
 

1967 births
Living people
Avangard Omsk players
Belarusian expatriate sportspeople in the United States
Belarusian ice hockey centres
Eisbären Berlin players
HC Dynamo Moscow players
HC Khimik Voskresensk players
Ice hockey players at the 1998 Winter Olympics
Kalamazoo Wings (1974–2000) players
Madison Monsters players
Milwaukee Admirals (IHL) players
Olympic ice hockey players of Belarus
Philadelphia Bulldogs players
Sarnia Sting coaches
SKA Saint Petersburg players
Soviet ice hockey centres
Ice hockey people from Minsk
Belarusian expatriate sportspeople in Germany
Belarusian expatriate sportspeople in Russia
Belarusian expatriate sportspeople in Italy
Belarusian expatriate sportspeople in Switzerland
Belarusian expatriate ice hockey people
Expatriate ice hockey players in Germany
Expatriate ice hockey players in Russia
Expatriate ice hockey players in Italy
Expatriate ice hockey players in Switzerland
Expatriate ice hockey players in the United States